Long Ago and Far Away is a duo album by Charlie Haden and Brad Mehldau. It was recorded in 2007 and released by Impulse! Records in 2018.

Music and recording 
The music is from a 2007 concert at the Enjoy Jazz Festival in Mannheim, Germany. The material is standards. On "Au Privave", after the theme is stated, "a change of key signals a narrative switch to flurries of notes, trills and single note lines. Haden, unhurried, shifts harmonic focus underneath until the theme returns, pulled into fragments that lean back on the beat."

Release and reception

The album was released by Impulse! Records in 2018. The AllMusic reviewer commented on the "casual intensity, and the willingness to commune with yearning lyricism one minute and dive into dark voids the next, that make Mehldau and Haden's duo work here so compelling."

Track listing
"Au Privave" 	
"My Old Flame"
"What'll I Do"
"Long Ago and Far Away"
"My Love and I"
"Everything Happens to Me"

Personnel
 Charlie Haden – bass
 Brad Mehldau – piano

References

Brad Mehldau live albums
Charlie Haden live albums
Impulse! Records live albums
2018 live albums